Chrysostomos II (1880–1968) was Archbishop of Athens and All Greece from 14 February 1962 to 11 May 1967.

His Beatitude Chrysostomos II (Hadjistavrou) of Athens was the Archbishop of Athens and All Greece and primate of the Church of Greece from 1962 to 1967.

Life 

Patriarch Chrysostomos was born in 1878 in Asia Minor. After he completed his gymnasium education, he entered the Theological School of Halki, graduating 1902. He then joined the faculty of the University of Lausanne in Lausanne, Switzerland. At the university he was able to establish a relationship with the various heterodox people.

After his return to Greece, Chrysostomos was ordained a deacon as he entered holy orders. In 1910, he was consecrated bishop as vicar to the Metropolitan of Smyrna. In 1913, he was appointed Metropolitan of Philadelphia. During his tenure at Philadelphia, Metr. Chrysostomos engaged in activities involving national liberation that resulted in his being sentenced to death by the Sultan's Viceroy Rahmi Bey. However, through the intervention of some influential people he escaped execution. Subsequently, Metr. Chrysostomos was transferred and named Metropolitan of Ephesus.

In 1922, Metr. Chrysostomos moved to Greece following the exchange of people that took place after the Second Greco-Turkish War. In Greece, he was appointed the metropolitan of a new metropolis, a position he retained until he was elected Archbishop of Athens. In 1961, Metr. Chrysostomos presided at the Pan-Orthodox Meeting of Rhodes that was a preparatory meeting to an Orthodox wide synod .

Metr. Chrysostomos was elected Archbishop of Athens on 14 February 1962. Following the military coup in April 1967, Abp. Chrysostomos was pressured by the new military government to step down. On 11 May 1967, Abp. Chrysostomos was forced to retire as the ruling hierarch of Greece. In June 1968, he died.

References

1880 births
1968 deaths
Archbishops of Athens and All Greece
People from Aydın
Bishops of Ephesus
20th-century Eastern Orthodox archbishops